Platidiolus is a genus of ground beetles in the family Carabidae. There are about five described species in Platidiolus.

Species
These five species belong to the genus Platidiolus:
 Platidiolus borealis Zamotajlov & Lafer, 2001  (Russia)
 Platidiolus brinevi Zamotajlov & Lafer, 2001  (Russia)
 Platidiolus nazarenkoi Lafer & Zamotajlov, 2001  (Russia)
 Platidiolus rufus Chaudoir, 1878  (Russia)
 Platidiolus vandykei Kurnakov, 1960  (North America)

References

Carabidae